Banta Corporation was a major printing, imaging, and supply chain management company of the United States, based in Menasha, Wisconsin, for all of its 105 years. Founded in 1901, it was acquired by Chicago-based RR Donnelley in late 2006.

History
George Banta (1857–1935) began printing forms while working as an insurance agent. In 1901, he opened a storefront and formed the George Banta Printing Company, renamed two years later the George Banta Publishing Company. Banta's home, where he started the company, now known as the George, Sr., and Ellen Banta House, is listed on the National Register of Historic Places.

Much of the company's early growth came from educational contracts. George Banta, a member of Phi Delta Theta fraternity at Indiana University in Bloomington, secured a contract to print its national magazine, The Scroll. Other national fraternities and sororities followed; the company would also publish Banta's Greek Exchange, a monthly review of fraternity and sorority news, and several editions of Baird's Manual of American College Fraternities. George's late father, David Demaree Banta (1833–1896), was dean of the Indiana University School of Law, and through this connection the company also won orders for university catalogs and yearbooks, textbooks, and magazines. In 1910 it moved to a new building, where its headquarters would remain for nearly the remainder of the century.  The elder Banta had helped found the Phi Delta Theta fraternity.

In the 1920s, one of George Banta, Jr.'s brothers-in-law, Russell Sharp, created an elementary school workbook and turned to Banta Publishing to print it. Its expertise in publishing them helped make it a leader in production of other softcover books. In 1954, it adopted the name George Banta Company, Inc. and in 1971 it went public, traded on NASDAQ as BNTA. After 27 years, it moved to the  New York Stock Exchange on December 18, 1998, where it traded under the symbol BN for the next eight years.

Starting in 1969, the Banta Company began a program of acquisitions of imaging and printing-related companies as well as manufacturers of packaging, paper products, and display equipment. It also diversified within its print business, printing catalogs, trade books, and the Parker Brothers board game Trivial Pursuit.

As the printing industry declined in the early 21st century, Banta spun off several units to focus on its core businesses. In August 2006, Connecticut-based envelope printer Cenveo made an unsolicited offer to buy the company, but Banta's management considered it hostile. (Banta's stock price had recently fallen from the low $40s in late July; it closed at a penny under $34 on August 8, but the news shot the price up to $46 the following day.) Instead, it accepted a $1.3 billion offer from major competitor RR Donnelley of Chicago in October, at $52.50 cash per share ($36.50 plus a $16 special dividend).

The cash deal was fortuitous for Banta shareholders, as the value of RR Donnelley stock declined considerably in 2008.

Family company
Founder Banta remained president until his death in 1935 at age 78. His wife Nellie, who ran day-to-day operations from 1904 to 1911, assumed the presidency afterwards until her death in 1951. Their son, George Banta, Jr., joined the company in 1911 and served as president from 1951 to 1961. In 1965, George, Jr.'s son George Banta III took over, stepping aside to become chairman in 1971, where he remained until 1983.  The company's final chairman & CEO in 2006 was Stephanie Streeter.

References

Publishing companies established in 1901
Printing companies of the United States
American companies disestablished in 2006
RR Donnelley
Defunct manufacturing companies based in Wisconsin